Teor and Kur are two Austronesian language varieties of the Central–Eastern Malayo-Polynesian branch spoken near Kei Island, Indonesia. They are reportedly mutually intelligible.

References

Languages of Indonesia
Central Malayo-Polynesian languages